Emil Pavich (July 30, 1931 – May 6, 2005) was an American politician.

Emil Pavich was born in Council Bluffs, Iowa, to parents Guy and Josephine. He graduated from Thomas Jefferson High School in 1949. After serving during the Korean War with the United States Army, he worked for Kellogg's in Omaha, Nebraska, until 1991. He was elected to two terms on the Council Bluffs City Council, then served in the Iowa House of Representatives from 1975 to 1993.

He died on May 6, 2005, in Council Bluffs, Iowa, at age 73.

References

1931 births
2005 deaths
Democratic Party members of the Iowa House of Representatives
Iowa city council members
20th-century American politicians
Politicians from Council Bluffs, Iowa
United States Army personnel of the Korean War